Lepidogma is a genus of snout moths. It was described by Edward Meyrick in 1890.

Species
 Lepidogma ambifaria 
 Lepidogma atomalis (Christoph, 1887)
 Lepidogma chlorophilalis Hampson, 1912
 Lepidogma farinodes 
 Lepidogma flagellalis
 Lepidogma hyrcanalis
 Lepidogma latifasciata
 Lepidogma megaloceros
 Lepidogma melaleucalis
 Lepidogma melanobasis
 Lepidogma melanolopha
 Lepidogma melanospila
 Lepidogma minimalis 
 Lepidogma obatralis (Christoph, 1877)
 Lepidogma olivalis (Swinhoe, 1895)
 Lepidogma rubricalis 
 Lepidogma rufescens
 Lepidogma tamaricalis (Mann, 1873)
 Lepidogma violescens Dyar, 1914
 Lepidogma wiltshirei

References

Epipaschiinae
Pyralidae genera